The 2019 Donegal Senior Football Championship was the 97th official edition of Donegal GAA's premier Gaelic football tournament for senior graded clubs in County Donegal. 16 teams compete with the winner representing Donegal in the Ulster Senior Club Football Championship. The championship begins with four groups of four and continues with a knock-out format.

Gaoth Dobhair were the defending Donegal and Ulster champions after they defeated Naomh Conaill of Glenties 0-17 to 1-7 in the 2018 final. However they failed to defend their crown, losing the final to Naomh Conaill by one point after a second replay. 

This was Glenfin's return to the senior grade after a two-year exodus when claiming the 2018 I.F.C. title.

Malin were relegated back to the 2020 I.F.C. after 16 seasons in the top-flight when losing their Relegation Final to Ardara. Back in 2003, Malin gained promotion to the S.F.C. for the first time in the club's history. Although Malin lost the I.F.C. Quarter-Final to eventual champions St. Michael's that year, they earned promotion to Division 1 from Division 2 of the Donegal Leagues. At that time, promotion to the S.F.C. could be acquired through the leagues.

Team changes

 

The following teams changed division since the 2018 championship season.

To S.F.C.
Promoted from 2018 I.F.C.
 Glenfin -  (I.F.C. Champions)

From S.F.C.
Relegated to 2019 I.F.C.
 Burt

Format
The 2019 County Championship took the same format as previous championships in which there was four groups of four with the top two qualifying for the quarter-finals. Bottom of each group play in relegation play-offs to decide which team is relegated the 2020 Intermediate championship.

Group stage
All 16 teams enter the competition at this stage. The top 2 teams in each group go into the Quarter-Finals while the bottom team of each group entered a Relegation Playoff.

Group A

Round 1
 Ardara 2-10, 4-18 St Michael's, 7/9/2019,
 Gaoth Dobhair 1-3, 0-6 St Eunan's, 8/9/2019,

Round 2
 St Michael's 1-3, 1-8 Gaoth Dobhair, 14/9/2019,
 St Eunan's 1-18, 1-6 Ardara, 15/9/2019,

Round 3
 Ardara 0-7, 2-19 Gaoth Dobhair, 22/9/2019,
 St Michael's 0-12, 0-12 St Eunan's, 22/9/2019,

Group B

Round 1
 Seán MacCumhaills 5-14, 1-18 An Clochán Liath, 7/9/2019,
 Naomh Conaill 1-15, 1-9 Killybegs, 8/9/2019,

Round 2
 An Clochán Liath 1-3, 2-16 Naomh Conaill, 14/9/2019,
 Killybegs 2-8, 1-9 Seán MacCumhaills, 15/9/2019,

Round 3
 Naomh Conaill 0-12, 0-9 Seán MacCumhaills, 21/9/2019,
 Killybegs 0-16, 0-9 An Clochán Liath, 21/9/2019,

Group C

Round 1
 Four Masters 0-10, 0-14 Milford, 7/9/2019,
 Glenfin 1-11, 0-14 Glenswilly, 8/9/2019,

Round 2
 Milford 1-17, 3-8 Glenfin, 14/9/2019,
 Glenswilly 0-6, 2-11 Four Masters, 15/9/2019,

Round 3
 Glenfin 1-14, 1-7 Four Masters, 22/9/2019,
 Glenswilly 1-13, 2-7 Milford, 22/9/2019,

Group D

Round 1
 Termon 0-11, 0-12 Réalt na Mara, 8/9/2019,
 Kilcar 3-16, 0-7 Malin, 8/9/2019,

Round 2
 Réalt na Mara 1-13, 1-20 Kilcar, 15/9/2019,
 Malin 1-11, 0-17 Termon, 15/9/2019,

Round 3
 Malin 2-14, 2-22 Réalt na Mara, 22/9/2019,
 Kilcar 3-18, 1-6 Termon, 22/9/2019,

Knock-out stage

Quarter-finals

Semi-finals

Final

Final replay

Final second replay

Relegation playoffs

Relegation semi-Finals

Relegation Final

Ulster Senior Club Football Championship

Television rights
The following matches were broadcast live on national television, unless otherwise indicated:

References

Donegal Senior Football Championship
Donegal SFC
Donegal Senior Football Championship